LibanPost is the national post office of Lebanon. It is relatively a young postal operator, established in 1998. It is privately owned, in charge of operating the postal sector. Since its inception, LibanPost embarked on a program of rebuilding infrastructure, diversification and branding.

Services
The company offers more than 1000 services, covering mail and express, financial services, retail and merchandising activities, business, e-commerce and governmental services. LibanPost provides governmental services portfolio across 15 public institutions, positioning itself as a formal intermediary between citizens and governmental institutions. It handles the customer care roles and manages logistics related to the service fulfillment.

LibanPost is a member of the Express Mail Service.

Size of operations
The company handles an average of 20 million shipments yearly. Up to the year 2011, LibanPost had executed 8 million governmental formalities. LibanPost operates today a growing network of 74 post offices covering the country, and is present in high traffic areas such as shopping malls, with extended business hours, in universities and corporations. The company employs 900 employees averaging 35 years old.

Automation
Automation touched all aspects of LibanPost's business. LibanPost has developed applications for 150 services and 350 sub-services, including a governmental services platform which consolidates, in a user-friendly design, governmental services and end-to-end processing. LibanPost developed innovative services such as the Home Service facility, providing post office services at the customer's premises, and address coding using GPS technology.

See also
Postage stamps and postal history of Lebanon

References

External links
Official website.

Communications in Lebanon
Philately of Lebanon